Known internationally as EMERCOM, Russia's Ministry for Civil Defence, Emergency Situations and Disaster Relief is composed of both military and civilian personnel. It encompasses land, naval and air assets, the State Fire Service, rescue teams and its own academies.  This article is dedicated to the award system of this ministry of the Russian Federation.  EMERCOM awards are subordinate to state awards.  All awards herein were approved by orders of the Minister of Emergency Situations, these order numbers and inception dates are included as quick references to facilitate any further research.

Ministry of the Russian Federation for Affairs of Civil Defence, Emergencies and Disaster Relief (EMERCOM)

Medals

Decorations

Departmental Medals

Emblems

See also
Emercom
Awards and decorations of the Russian Federation
List of awards of independent services of the Russian Federation
Ministerial awards of the Russian Federation
Honorary titles of the Russian Federation
Awards and decorations of the Soviet Union

External links 
 State Awards of the Russian Federation - Official site  In Russian
 EMERCOM - Official Site  In Russian

References

Ministry of Emergency Situations (Russia)
Orders, decorations, and medals of Russia
Russian awards
National symbols of Russia
Military awards and decorations of Russia
Humanitarian and service awards
Civil awards and decorations of Russia